These are the official results of the Men's 400 metres hurdles event at the 1994 European Championships in Helsinki, Finland, held at Helsinki Olympic Stadium on 7, 8, and 10 August 1994.

Medalists

Final

Semifinals
Held on 8 August 1994

Qualifying heats

Participation
According to an unofficial count, 37 athletes from 21 countries participated in the event.

 (2)
 (1)
 (1)
 (3)
 (2)
 (3)
 (1)
 (1)
 (1)
 (3)
 (1)
 (2)
 (2)
 (1)
 (1)
 (1)
 (3)
 (3)
 (1)
 (1)
 (3)

See also
 1990 Men's European Championships 400m Hurdles (Split)
 1992 Men's Olympic 400m Hurdles (Barcelona)
 1993 Men's World Championships 400m Hurdles (Stuttgart)
 1995 Men's World Championships 400m Hurdles (Gothenburg)
 1996 Men's Olympic 400m Hurdles (Atlanta)
 1997 Men's World Championships 400m Hurdles (Athens)
 1998 Men's European Championships 400m Hurdles (Budapest)

References

 Results

Hurdles 400
400 metres hurdles at the European Athletics Championships